Reguly may refer to;

 Antal Reguly
 Eric Reguly
 Robert Reguly
 Reguły, a village in Poland
 Mount Regula, Research Range,  Ural Mountains (named after Antal Reguly)